The United Arab Emirates has an embassy in London while the United Kingdom maintains an embassy in Abu Dhabi and is unique in having another Embassy in Dubai, albeit with Her Britannic Majesty's Consul-General to Dubai and the Northern Emirates, as opposed to a separate British Ambassador. The UAE-UK relations have been described as a "special relationship".

History 
Before the country's formation in 1971, the emirates which currently constitute the UAE were once all part of the Trucial States and independent sheikhdoms allied with the United Kingdom, assigned as British protectorates by the General Maritime Treaty of 1820. The main purpose of this relationship was to ensure the passage to British India, by excluding the pirates who then raided the country's coast on the Persian Gulf.

An agreement between the British and the ruler of Sharjah in 1932 led to the construction of a fortified airfield known as Al Mahatta Fort, to allow a stop on the Imperial Airways route to Brisbane, Australia. Royal Air Force aircraft were subsequently allowed to refuel at Sharjah in World War II. Al Mahatta Museum is a reminder of the BOAC (formerly Imperial Airways) and other flights that used to frequent the UAE's first airport.

Britain also played a significant role in the formation of the United Arab Emirates. It was Britain's defence of the Sheikhs of Abu Dhabi in the 1940s and 50s against encroachments and claims on its lands, by the then King of Saudi Arabia, that safeguarded the territorial integrity of what would become the United Arab Emirates. In 1952, a Saudi force invaded the area of what is now Al Ain (Buraimi on the Omani side) and it was the British, in conjunction with the Sheikhs of Abu Dhabi and the Sultan of Oman, who forcibly evicted in them in a conflict known as the Buraimi Dispute.

The tensions related to the Buraimi Dispute led to the formation, in 1951, of the Trucial Oman Scouts (formerly the Trucial Oman Levies): a British officered, locally raised force who ensured safety in the Emirates until it was disbanded in December 1971 with the formation of the United Arab Emirates. The Trucial Oman Scouts were critical in the actual development of the UAE's independent military, as the remnants of the Scouts would form the nucleus of what would eventually become the UAE Armed Forces.

Inward visits 
In November 2010, Her Majesty Queen Elizabeth II made an historic visit to His Highness Sheikh Khalifa bin Zayed Al Nahyan, President of the UAE and Ruler of Abu Dhabi, her first since 1979, when she also visited Sheikh Rashid Bin Saeed Al Maktoum, Vice-President and Prime Minister of the UAE and Ruler of Dubai. During the 1979 visit she opened a number of ports and buildings including the Dubai World Trade Center, Dubai Municipality and Port Rashid.

On her second visit in 2010, The Queen spent 2 days touring the Zayed Museum and visiting dignitaries of the Ruling Family, whilst her Secretary of State for Foreign & Commonwealth Affairs (The Rt. Hon. William Hague) signed the Abu Dhabi Declaration 2010 with His Highness Sheikh Abdullah Bin Zayed Al Nahyan, UAE Minister of Foreign Affairs, reaffirming the 1971 friendship treaty between the two nations. His Royal Highness the Duke of Edinburgh also signed a Memorandum of Understanding in his role as Chancellor of Cambridge University with His Highness Sheikh Nahyan Bin Mubarak Al Nahyan, UAE Minister of Education.

In 2013, President Sheikh Khalifa bin Zayed Al Nahyan visited the UK for the first time and was the second visit by a UAE president since Sheikh Zayeds visit in 1989.

Economic ties 
The Secretary of State for Foreign & Commonwealth Affairs noted upon signing Abu Dhabi 2010 in the presence of Her Majesty and His Highness Sheikh Khalifa that 100,000 British citizens lived in the Emirates and over a million visited each year for business and leisure.

Beside this each country share consistently high rates of mutual trade and investment.

In September 2021, United Arab Emirates pledged to invest £10bn in UK in the field of clean energy, technology and infrastructure.

Political ties 

Both Britain and the Emirates have historic association in terms of co-operation in the areas of law enforcement, defence, training and military technology. This was reflected recently in the signing of an agreement to co-operate in the development of the Emirates' own nuclear energy plants in the future.

In November 2018, the United Kingdom foreign minister Jeremy Hunt threatened the UAE with "serious diplomatic consequences" after it sentenced a British academic Matthew Hedges to life in prison for allegedly spying for the UK government.

Princess Haya bin Hussein, a Jordanian princess was also married to Sheikh Mohammed, the Emir of Dubai. She fled with their two children to the United Kingdom in 2019 and their marriage was ended. A British Court told Sheikh Mohammed to pay money to the Princess. One of Sheikh Mohammed's daughters Sheikha Shamsa, was taken from the UK to the UAE and UK police did not want to investigate this further.

In 2022, the heads of both countries passed away. In May, Sheikh Khalifa died at the age of 73. In September, Queen Elizabeth II died at the age of 96. The UAE announced that there would be a three days mourning period.

People 
Well-known Britons include Edward Henderson, who wrote a book "Arabian Destiny" on his career in the region after World War Two developing oil concessions and learning about local politics both within and beyond his role in the Foreign & Commonwealth Office. Uniquely on his retirement he was invited to assist in establishing the national archives in Abu Dhabi by His Highness Sheikh Zayed Bin Sultan Al Nahyan, founding President of the UAE from 1971 and Ruler of Abu Dhabi prior to then.

Other well-known authors with experience of the Emirates include Shirley Kay "Mother Without a Mask" and Jeremy Williams OBE "Don't They Know It's Friday?".

An 18th century masterpiece painting, titled ‘Mary Magdalene in Ecstasy’, was gifted to the UAE by the United Kingdom as a token of goodwill and a symbol of enduring friendship between both countries in July 2019. The painting was painted by Ary Scheffer in 1856 and is from the Lubin Family Private Collection. The painting was presented by the British Ambassador to the UAE Patrick Moody to Dr Hamed bin Mohamed Al Suwaidi, the chairman of Abu Dhabi Arts Society. Dr. Al Suwaidi suggested that the painting may be showcased at the Louvre Abu Dhabi.

See also 
 Britons in the United Arab Emirates
 Emiratis in the United Kingdom

References

External links 
 The Evolution of the Armed Forces of the United Arab Emirates by Athol Yates

 
United Kingdom
Bilateral relations of the United Kingdom